is a single by Japanese singer Miho Komatsu and her first single released under the Giza Studio label. Unlike her previous single which was released as maxi-single, this one was released in 8cm single format. The single reached #16 for the first time and sold 21,130 copies. It charted for three weeks and sold 37,140 copies.

Track list
All songs are written and composed by Miho Komatsu and arranged by Hirohito Furui

it is used as an ending song for the TBS show Rank Oukoku.
single version and album version have different arrangements
"My destination..."
 (instrumental)
"My destination..." (instrumental)

References 

1999 singles
Miho Komatsu songs
Songs written by Miho Komatsu
1999 songs
Giza Studio singles
Being Inc. singles
Song recordings produced by Daiko Nagato